VAP may refer to:

 Venous access port, a medical port
 Ventilator-associated pneumonia, sub-type of hospital-acquired pneumonia (HAP)
 Vertical auto profile, cholesterol, lipid and lipoprotein blood test
 Vapour Pressure Deficit, physical effect
 Vascular adhesion protein
 VAP (company), a Japanese entertainment company
 Véhicule d'Action dans la Profondeur, a military vehicle made by Panhard
 Virtual Access Point, a method of using multiple BSSIDs on single physical Wireless access point
 VAP protein family, where VAP is the umbrella term for the conserved VAMP-associated protein, where VAMP stands for vesicle-associated membrane protein. Humans have two VAPs: VAPA and VAPB